Maarjamäe (Estonian for "Maria's Hill") is a subdistrict in the district of Pirita, Tallinn, the capital of Estonia. It has a population of 2,307.

Landmarks and institutions
Estonian Academy of Security Sciences (Kase 61)

Maarjamäe Palace

Maarjamäe Palace is locating on the area of earlier Maarjamäe summer manor being its main building. The castle was built in 1872.

Nowadays, the building is used by Estonian History Museum (administratively belongs to Kadriorg subdistrict).

Gallery

See also
Maarjamäe Memorial
Estonian Academy of Security Sciences
Lillepi Park

References

External links

Subdistricts of Tallinn